Amy S. Greenberg (born 1968) is an American historian, and Edwin Erle Sparks Professor of History and Women's Studies, at Pennsylvania State University.

Life
She graduated from the University of California at Berkeley and earned her PhD at Harvard University.

Awards

She was awarded a 2009 Guggenheim fellowship.

She received the Robert M. Utley Prize in 2013 from the Western History Association for  A Wicked War: Polk, Clay, Lincoln, and the 1846 U.S. Invasion of Mexico.

Works

References

External links

Greenberg discusses A Wicked War at the Pritzker Military Museum & Library on December 7, 2012
Lady First: The World of First Lady Sarah Polk: Amy S. Greenberg lecture at the National Archives on February 15, 2019

21st-century American historians
University of California, Berkeley alumni
Pennsylvania State University faculty
American women historians
Harvard Graduate School of Arts and Sciences alumni
21st-century American women writers
1968 births
Living people